Kim Dong-yeon is a South Korean playwright and theater director. Kim, is nicknamed Blue Chip Director of Daehak-ro, made his directorial debut in 2003 through the play Fantasy Fairy Tale (2003).

South Korean Musical Maybe Happy Ending that was premiered in 2017 is his most famous work as director. He is known for his two military musicals, The Shinheung Military Academy (2018) and Return (2019). He is also known as director of South Korean adaptation of stage play Human (2010), The Pride (2014), M. Butterfly (2017), and Shakespeare R&J (2018).

Career

Early career 
Kim Dong-yeon joined theater club in high school to achieve his dream to be an actor. He worked hard practicing his vocalization in the backyard near his high school. Then enrolled in theater department at Chung-Ang University. He performed on stage as an actor throughout his college days. However, he found that he's more suitable to be a theatre director.

After graduating, Kim worked as staff for Persona Productions (페르소나 프로덕션) that created Nanta (난타) and Jump (난타), for two years. He also worked as artistic director of magic performances Lee Eun-gyeol's Magic Concert. Later He also worked as assistant director in Daehak-ro.

Debut as director 
Kim Dong-Yeon founded theater company The Poet and the Samurai (극단 시인과 무사). The name express his philosophy that 'play' is as beautiful as a poet's poem, but also as powerful as a samurai's blade. This company hold copyright of Fantasy Fairy Tale, a creative musical written by Kim. This work express his fascination with clown, an ironic being that always gives laughter but expresses sadness. In this play there are three clowns, war clown, art clown and  love clown. The three clown narrate love story between Hans, a piano player who lost his hearing during the war, and Marie, a dancing woman who lost his sight, love each other in a warm and lyrical way.

Kim made his directorial debut through the premiere of Fantasy Fairy Tale. His first stage was in Hakjeon Blue Small Theater as part of 6th Seoul Edge Theater Festival  in November 2003. Kim applied to many blockgrant to develop his work further. In October 2005 he entered Young Director Contest Showcase Performance of Seoul Art Market Participation. He also applied to Korea Culture and Arts Council Fund application but failed. However only after a long period of revision, it was finally able to perform on stage again in 2006 with the funding from the Seoul Foundation for Arts and Culture.

In 2007, Eda Entertainment re-opened the Sinsi Musical Theater as a 'Cultural Space Eda' in Daehak-ro with two theaters. Fantasy Fairy Tale was selected as the first work of the 'Eda’s Stage Discovery Series' ('이다의 무대발견시리즈).

Early career as director
In 2006–2008, Kim worked as director of a stage play 70 Minutes of Romance written by Cheon Gyeun-ho. It was joint production between Eda Entertainment and 2B Company.

In October 2007, Kim became 4th director of musical Finding Mr. Destiny. He joined the middle of season 3 and in charge of the Season 4.

In 2007, Kim adapted  into a play. The original is a series of short stories by the Japanese writer Hideo Okuda which features the fictional psychiatrist .

In 2009, Kim directed South Korean adaptation of My First Time. My First Time (2007) is an off-Broadway play written by Ken Davenport, a two-time Tony Award-winning theatre producer and playwright.

Hamlet - The Story of a Sad Clown (2009) started from a school performance in 2001, when director Kim Dong-yeon reconstructed and directed Shakespeare's Hamlet and actor Kim Kang-woo cast as 'Hamlet'. It was performed at Daehak-ro for 5 days in 2009.

Kim adapted Human (2010) by Bernard Werber into a play. The play Human is a two-person play about scientist Raul and animal trainer Samanta. It starts with the unique setting of a man and woman who are completely unfamiliar with a glass wall. they wake up one day startled by a roar. Through isolated men and women, the difficult subject of 'exploring human nature through a non-human point of view is solved with the artist's unique imagination.

Infinity Challenge
In the end of 2011, Kim Tae-ho of Infinity Challenge planned to do another segment of I'm A Singer In My Own Right. One of cast Member of the show, Jung Hyung-don wanted to do musical concept performance for Spring Chicken Soup (영계백숙 or Younggye Baeksook). Kim Tae-ho then hold a meeting with Kim Dong-yeon, to ask him to direct the performance. Then Won Mi-sol as music director and Kim Kyung-yeop as choreographer also join the project.

Kim suggested the concept of heroic story in a musical format. I'm A Singer In My Own Right was broadcast in MBC as three episode: Episode 281(December 24, 2011), Episode 282 (December 31, 2011) and Episode 283 (January 7, 2012).

Musical adaptation 
In November 2011, Kim joined the 'Kim Soo-ro Project' to adapt Coffee Prince into a musical. This is Kim Soo-ro second project as producer after play Crazy Romance. The musical adaptation was closer to source material, novel with the same name by Lee Seon-mi. Kim Dong-yeon adapted the script with Jung Min-ah who also lyricist for this project. Also joined this project were Lee Jin-wook as composer, Yang Joo-in as Music director and  Kyung-yeop as choreographer. Musical Coffee Prince 1st Store only focused on Choi Han-gyeol and Go Eun-chan romance. Double-cast as Han-gyeol were Kim Jae-beom and Kim Tae-han. Eun-chan were played by rookie actress Yu Joo-hye and Hong Ji-hee.

In 2012, Kim worked with Argentine director Gustavo Zajac in stage musical adaptation of popular drama series Lovers in Paris. It was premiered at the D-Cube Arts Center in April 2012, starring Lee Ji-hoon and Jung Sang-yeon as Han Ki-joo, Bang Jin-wi and Oh So-yeon as Kang Tae-young, and Lee Hyun, Jung Woo-soo and Run as Yoon Soo-hyuk.

It is about a late-night diner, open from midnight to dawn, and its eccentric patrons. It was already adapted into Japanese Drama Midnight Diner in 2009. Musical Midnight Diner was a canceled project, but Kim, lyricist-writer Jeong Young and composer Kim Hye-seong felt bad to drop it and decided to keep working on it. Park Yong-ho, CEO of Musical Heaven, helped to acquire the right to perform from Japan. With support from Doosan Art Center, a reading performance was held in February, 2012.

As a result, Hong Ki-yu, the CEO of Eukdo Co., Ltd, showed his intention to produce. December 11 From February 17, 2013, Midnight Diner performed on the stage of Dongsung Hall, Dongsung Art Center, Daehak-ro, Seoul. It was produced by Eukdo Co., Ltd, and invested by M Venture Investment and Interpark INT. Japanese manga publisher Shogakukan collaborates on the production. Japanese stage designer Masako Ito joins forces. It won the Innovation Award at the '3rd Yegreen Awards' held at Chungmu Art Hall in Jung-gu, Seoul.

In the end of 2012, Kim became mentor of Chungmu Art Hall 'The 1st Musical House Black and Blue' (제1회 뮤지컬하우스 블랙 앤 블루).

Director of licensed musical and 10th debut anniversary 
Kim first attempt in directing a license musical was in 2013 South Korean adaptation of Gutenberg! The Musical! written by Scott Brown and Anthony King. In this two-man musical spoof, a pair of aspiring playwrights  Bud and Doug, perform a backers' audition for their new, hilariously ill-advised project – a big, splashy musical about printing press inventor Johannes Gutenberg. South Korean version of musical Gutenberg was premiered in Medium Theater Black of Chungmu Art Center in August 2013.

It was followed by another license musical Carmen. Written by Norman Allen, lyrics by Jack Murphy, and music by Frank Wildhorn, it is based on the novella of the same name. Carmen premiered in October 2008 at the Karlín Musical Theater in Prague Czech. The musical Carmen is a work that combines splendid performances such as magic, acrobatics and circus. Hue Park was lyricist for South Korean adaptation and Kim’s experience in magic show was one of the reason he was chosen for this work.

On March 5, 2013, the play Fantasy Fairy Tale was back on stage to celebrate the 10th anniversary of the performance. It performed until May 2013 Art One Theater Hall 3. Kim also applied to Korea Center for Performing Arts 2013 3rd Exhibition Hall Competition. His proposal won, as result Fantasy Fairy Tale was selected part of 2013 Korea Performing Arts Center Excellent Repertoire Series and can perform in Grand Theater of Daehangno Arts Theater with 504 seats. Choreographer Song Hee-jin, who took on the role of Marie at the time of the premiere was in charge of the choreography. Actors who appeared in the premiere in 2003, Oh Yong, Choi Yo-han, Choi Dae-hoon, Lee Gap-sun, Lee Hyeon-bae, also joined.

Theatre Yeoljeon 
In 2014, Kim directed adaptation of Theatre's Fever 5 - Pride, one of representative repertoire of the Daehangno brand performance 'Theatre's Yeoljeon'. The Pride is the debut work and second play of Greek-British author Alexi Kaye Campbell. In November 2008 it was produced for the Royal Court Theatre Upstairs for which he was awarded The Critics' Circle Prize for Most Promising Playwright and the John Whiting Award for Best New Play. The production, directed by Jamie Lloyd, was also awarded a Laurence Olivier Award for Outstanding Achievement in an affiliate theatre. South Korean adaptation was written by Ji Yi-seon and translated by Kim Soo-bin and premiered in the Art One Theater in 2014.

The story unfolds back and forth between 1958 and the present (2014). Through Philip, Oliver, Peter, and Sylvia, who live in two eras, the play talk about the socially underprivileged represented by sexual minorities. In the premiere, Lee Myeong-haeng and Jung Sang-yoon was double-cast as Philip. Oh Jong-hyuk and Park Eun-seok played the role of 'Oliver'. Kim So-jin and Kim Ji-hyun played the role of 'Sylvia'.  and Kim Jong-goo was double-cast as 'Peter'.

In 2015, Kim directed the world's first hologram musical "School OZ" by SM Entertainment (SM). It was opened on January 14, 2015 at SMTOWN THEATRE on the 5th floor of SMTOWN COEX Artium, a complex cultural space located in Samseong-dong, Seoul. The musical "School Oz" was a fantastic hologram musical with 110 minutes of hit songs by SM artists, various characters such as wizards and witches, and rich attractions based on magic.

In 2015, Kim adapted a play by Australian playwright Andrew Bovell, Speaking in Tongues 'Confessions of the Lost'. The subtitle is said to have been newly added by director Kim Dong-yeon. Original Speaking in Tongues,(1996) first performed at the Griffin Theatre Company, Sydney. It won the 1997 AWGIE– Stage Award. Few years later, Bovell made it into a movie, Lantana (2001).

The Pride (2015) second performance opened on August 8, 2015 at Suhyeon Theater in Daehak-ro. Bae Soo-bin and Kang Pil-seok were cast for the role of Philip. Jeong Dong-hwa and Park Sung-hoon were cast for the role of 'Oliver'. Kim Kang-hee and Lee Jin-hee appear in the role of 'Sylvia'. Lee Won and Yang Seung-ri take turns in the role of 'Doctor/Man/Peter'.

Maybe Happy Ending 
In September 2015, Kim worked with Hue Park and Will Aronson on a try-out production of their new musical, “Maybe Happy Ending,” in Seeya Studio at Wooran Foundation. The musical was premiered by DaeMyoung Culture Factory in December 2016. In its premiere show, 70 out of 97 performances sold out. The show won 6 Korean Musical Awards, including Best Director. The English-language version of "Maybe Happy Ending" was awarded the 2017 Richard Rodgers Award by the American Academy of Arts and Letters. A new Korean production opened in 2018.

As playwright

Original work 
Hamlet - the story of a sad clown (햄릿 - 슬픈 광대 이야기) —2001
Fantasy Fairy Tale (환상동화) — 2003

Play adaptation 
 2019 — Musical Cyrano (시라노) with Kim Soo-bin
 2010 — Play Human (인간)
 2012 — Musical First Store of Coffee Prince with Jung Min-ah
 2009 — Musical My First Time (마이 퍼스트 타임)
 2007 — Play Doctor Irabu (닥터 이라부)

Stage

Musical 

_

Theatre

Awards and nominations

Notes

References

External links 
 Kim Dong-yeon at Daum Encyclopedia 
 Kim Dong-yeon at Naver 
 Kim Dong-yeon at PlayDB 

Living people
1975 births
Chung-Ang University alumni
Dramaturges
Modernist theatre
South Korean dramatists and playwrights
Theatre directors
Musical theatre directors